Ulrich Blank (born June 29, 1948 in Duisburg) is a doctor of electrical engineering in Essen, Germany. He was for many years CEO of Heinrich Industrie AG and was a member of various supervisory boards and advisory boards of family businesses. In September 2018, he was awarded the Cross of Merit of the Federal Republic of Germany for his many years of voluntary work in the cultural field, in particular in favor of the Museum Folkwang.

Activity in the culture committee of the city of Aachen 
Ulrich Blank studied electrical engineering and economics at the RWTH Aachen, where he also obtained his doctorate. In this time already he engaged himself as a member of German liberal party FDP in the field of cultural politics, which is why this party appointed him in the culture committee of the city of Aachen after the municipal election of 1975. His work there until 1979 brought him together with the Aachen industrialist and patron Peter Ludwig, from whose donations to the city of Cologne at that very time the Museum Ludwig emerged. Blank remained member of the FDP for more than 30 years later on.

Work for the Folkwang Museum 
Since 1996, Blank has been a member of the Folkwang Museum Association (Folkwang-Museumsverein e.V.), where he became treasurer in 2005, then in 2015 chairman, succeeding Achim Middelschulte. Since 2006, the museum has completed five major special exhibitions, whose implementation was administratively planned and financially monitored by Ulrich Blank. In contrast to other museum associations, the Folkwang Museum Association, founded in 1922, is the owner of the Folkwang Museum's collections in equal shares with the city of Essen due to a contract signed in the same year.

Further cultural engagement 
As a co-initiator and supporter of the scholarship program Junge Kunst in Essen [Young Art in Essen], he enabled non-established artists to present their work to the public. Since 2006, Ulrich Blank has also been a member of the board of the Society of Friends and Supporters of the Folkwang University of the Arts e.V., for which he is a jury member in competitions, as a contact for students and in various projects. As a board member of the Forum Kreuzeskirche e.V. (since 2007) he contributed to the renovation of the church organ and raised funds. He is also a member of the board of trustees of the Förderverein Evangelische Kirche Werden e.V., where he is particularly committed to the church music program.

Private life 
Blank has been married to Marie Luise Blank (born Werhahn) since 1974, they are parents of four adult children. His hobbies include cooking and playing the oboe. He lives in the Essen district of Bredeney.

Literature 
 Blank, Ulrich: Entwicklung eines Verfahrens zur Segmentierung von Warenverteilungssystemen [= Development of a Process for the Segmentation of Goods Distribution Systems], 151 p. (PhD Theses); Aachen, 1980

External Web Links
 Cross of Merit of the Federal Republic of Germany awarded to Dr. Ulrich Blank [in German] (Press Release of the city of Essen, issued Sept 21, 2018) 
 Interview with Ulrich Blank on the occasion of his election as chairman of the Folkwang Museum Association [in German] (Martina Schürmann, Westdeutsche Allgemeine Zeitung [WAZ vom 22.7.2015])

References

1948 births
People from Duisburg
Engineers from North Rhine-Westphalia
Businesspeople from Essen
Living people
Art museum people
Recipients of the Cross of the Order of Merit of the Federal Republic of Germany
RWTH Aachen University alumni